Russell County (standard abbreviation: RS) is a county in the U.S. state of Kansas. As of the 2020 census, the population was 6,691. The largest city and county seat is Russell. Russell, the county seat, was the home of former U.S. Senate Majority leader and 1996 GOP presidential nominee Bob Dole for many years. It was also the boyhood home of U.S. Senator Arlen Specter of Pennsylvania, who was born in Wichita.

History

Early history

For many millennia, the Great Plains of North America was inhabited by nomadic Native Americans.  From the 16th century to 18th century, the Kingdom of France claimed ownership of large parts of North America.  In 1762, after the French and Indian War, France secretly ceded New France to Spain, per the Treaty of Fontainebleau.

19th century
In 1802, Spain returned most of the land to France, but keeping title to about 7,500 square miles.  In 1803, most of the land for modern day Kansas was acquired by the United States from France as part of the Louisiana Purchase.

In 1854, the Kansas Territory was organized, then in 1861 Kansas became the 34th U.S. state.  In 1867, Russell County was established.

Geography

Adjacent counties
 Osborne County (north)
 Lincoln County (east)
 Ellsworth County (southeast)
 Barton County (south)
 Rush County (southwest)
 Ellis County (west)

Major highways
The city of Russell is the junction of Interstate 70, a major east-west highway through the Midwestern United States, and U.S. Route 281, which begins at the Canada–US border in North Dakota and ends at the Mexico–US border in Texas. I-70 also runs through Gorham on the western end of the county and Dorrance on the eastern end.

K-18, a major east-west state highway in northern Kansas, enters from Osborne County to the west and runs through Paradise before joining up with US 281 through Waldo.  US 281 and K-18 split again at the city limits of Luray, and K-18 continues east through Lucas and into Lincoln County. US 281 heads north into Osborne County.

South of I-70, US 281 heads into Barton County and towards the city of Great Bend.

Demographics

As of the census of 2000, there were 7,370 people, 3,207 households, and 2,020 families residing in the county.  The population density was 8 people per square mile (3/km2).  There were 3,871 housing units at an average density of 4 per square mile (2/km2).  The racial makeup of the county was 97.58% White, 0.50% Black or African American, 0.56% Native American, 0.33% Asian, 0.01% Pacific Islander, 0.27% from other races, and 0.75% from two or more races.  0.91% of the population were Hispanic or Latino of any race.

There were 3,207 households, out of which 25.40% had children under the age of 18 living with them, 53.40% were married couples living together, 7.10% had a female householder with no husband present, and 37.00% were non-families. 32.80% of all households were made up of individuals, and 16.80% had someone living alone who was 65 years of age or older.  The average household size was 2.23 and the average family size was 2.83.

In the county, the population was spread out, with 22.40% under the age of 18, 5.80% from 18 to 24, 23.30% from 25 to 44, 24.30% from 45 to 64, and 24.10% who were 65 years of age or older.  The median age was 44 years. For every 100 females there were 92.50 males.  For every 100 females age 18 and over, there were 88.70 males.

The median income for a household in the county was $29,284, and the median income for a family was $40,355. Males had a median income of $25,916 versus $17,957 for females. The per capita income for the county was $17,073.  About 9.10% of families and 12.00% of the population were below the poverty line, including 13.80% of those under age 18 and 8.50% of those age 65 or over.

Government

Presidential elections

Russell County is overwhelmingly Republican. The last Democrat to carry the county was Lyndon B. Johnson in 1964, and Franklin D. Roosevelt in 1932 and 1936 is the only other to ever achieve this feat. In 1996, aided by a strong “favorite son” vote, Russell was Bob Dole’s second strongest county nationwide behind the famous Republican bastion of Ochiltree County, Texas.

Laws
Russell County was a prohibition, or "dry", county until the Kansas Constitution was amended in 1986 and voters approved the sale of alcoholic liquor by the individual drink with a 30 percent food sales requirement.

Education
Schools in Russell County have experienced major change in the 2010-11 school year. USD 407, which previously served all of Russell County except the northwest and southeast corners, retracted its footprint and will only serve the cities of Russell, Gorham and Bunker Hill and areas to the south of Interstate 70 along and adjacent to US 281.

Lucas-Luray High School, previously operated by USD 407, was acquired by the school district in Sylvan Grove in western Lincoln County and will be converted into a K-6 school. Meanwhile, the elementary school in Luray has closed. Students in Lucas and Luray in grades 7-12 will attend school in Sylvan Grove.

Unified school districts
 Central Plains USD 112 (serves Dorrance and southeastern part of county south of I-70; extends into Barton, Ellsworth and Rice Counties)
 Sylvan–Lucas USD 299 (serves Lucas, Luray and northeast part of county along K-18; extends into Lincoln County)
 Paradise-Natoma-Waldo USD 399 (serves Paradise, Waldo and northwest part of county along K-18; extends into Osborne and Rooks Counties)
 Russell County USD 407 (serves cities of Russell, Gorham, Bunker Hill and rural south central and southwest parts of county; does not extend into any other counties)

Communities

Cities

 Bunker Hill
 Dorrance
 Gorham
 Lucas
 Luray
 Paradise
 Russell
 Waldo

Unincorporated communities
 Dubuque
 Fairport 
 Milberger

Ghost towns

 Bayne
 Blue Stem
 East Wolf
 Fay
 Forest Hill
 Greenvale
 Hawley
 Jack
 Kennebec
 Success
 Winterset
 Woodville

Townships
Russell County is divided into twelve townships.  The city of Russell is considered governmentally independent and is excluded from the census figures for the townships.  In the following table, the population center is the largest city (or cities) included in that township's population total, if it is of a significant size.

See also
 National Register of Historic Places listings in Russell County, Kansas

References

Notes

Further reading

County
 Russell County in the War : Being a Record of the War Activities of the County and the Part that it Played in the Great Struggle; John E. Wilson; Capper Printing; 190 pages; 1921.
 Plat Book of Russell County, Kansas; North West Publishing Co; 47 pages; 1901.
Trails
 Guide Map of the Best and Shortest Cattle Trail to the Kansas Pacific Railway; Kansas Pacific Railway Company; 1875. (Read Online)(Map)

External links

County
 
 Russell County - Directory of Public Officials
Other
 Russell County Fair, held the first week of August
Maps
 Russell County Maps: Current, Historic, KDOT
 Kansas Highway Maps: Current, Historic, KDOT
 Kansas Railroad Maps: Current, 1996, 1915, KDOT and Kansas Historical Society

 
Kansas counties
1867 establishments in Kansas
Populated places established in 1867